The 2006 Maui Invitational Tournament, an annual early-season college basketball tournament held in Lahaina, Hawaii, was held November 20-22 at Lahaina Civic Center.  The winning team was UCLA.

Bracket 

Maui Invitational Tournament
Maui Invitational
Maui